Carl Demetris Powell (born January 4, 1974) is a former American football defensive tackle.

High school 
He played high school football at Kettering High School in Detroit.

College 
Later, he played college football at the University of Louisville after transferring from Grand Rapids Community College.

Professional 
He was drafted in the 1997 NFL Draft by the Indianapolis Colts in the fifth round (156th overall).  In 1999, he played for the Rhein Fire in NFL Europa, then was signed by the Baltimore Ravens in the National Football League.  Then played with the Chicago Bears, Washington Redskins and Cincinnati Bengals.

External links 
Pro Football Reference

1974 births
Living people
Kettering High School alumni
Players of American football from Detroit
American football defensive linemen
Grand Rapids Raiders football players
Grand Rapids Community College alumni
Louisville Cardinals football players
Indianapolis Colts players
Rhein Fire players
Baltimore Ravens players
Chicago Bears players
Washington Redskins players
Cincinnati Bengals players